Gilbert Gerard (fl. 1575–1609) was an English Member of Parliament for Chester in Elizabeth I's 8th Parliament in 1593.

Biography
Gilbert Gerard was the first son and heir of William Gerard (died 1581) and  Dorothy, daughter of Andrew Barton of Smithills, Lancashire. He succeeded to his father's estate in 1581.

In 1593 he was well enough established to represent Chester in Parliament and by 1593 he was Customer of Chester (he duties on French and Rhenish wines) and held the position for a number of years.

Family
Gerard married Ellen, daughter of William Pearson of Chester.

Notes

References

16th-century births
17th-century deaths
English MPs 1593
People from Chester